Brachystomia omaensis is a species of sea snail, a marine gastropod mollusk in the family Pyramidellidae, the pyrams and their allies.

Description
The length of an adult shell varies between 3 mm and 5 mm.

Distribution
This species occurs in the Pacific Ocean off Japan and the Philippines.

References

 Higo, S., Callomon, P. & Goto, Y., 1999. Catalogue and bibliography of the marine shell-bearing Mollusca of Japan. Osaka. Elle Scientific Publications, . 749.

External links
 

Pyramidellidae
Gastropods described in 1938